Bad Girls is a British drama television series, created by Maureen Chadwick and Ann McManus, and produced by Shed Productions for ITV.

The series follows the lives of the prisoners and the staff within the fictional Larkhall prison's infamous G-wing. During the first three years of the series, exterior filming took place at HM Prison Oxford, located within Oxford Castle, before it was redeveloped into a hotel complex. A reconstruction of the prison's exterior was created and served as the filming location for the remainder of the series. The interior was a replica set of Oxford Prison's wing. Outside of its original filming location, several scenes took place around the London district, as well as scenes shot in Spain, Amsterdam and Peru.

The series was initially available on VHS, before being released several times in it entirety on DVD. Due to its success, it has been repeated on other British television channels, including ITV2, ITV3, Five Life, CBS Drama, CBS Action and Drama. It is also available to stream on services UKTV Play, BritBox and ITVX.

Series overview

Episodes

Series 1 (1999) 

Series one was broadcast on Tuesdays at 9.00 pm

Series 2 (2000) 

Series two was broadcast on Tuesdays at 9.00 pm

Series 3 (2001) 

Series three was broadcast on Tuesdays at 9.00 pm

Series 4 (2002) 

Series four was broadcast on Thursdays at 9.00 pm

Series 5 (2003) 

Series five was broadcast on Thursdays at 9.00 pm

Series 6 (2004) 

Series six was broadcast at 9.00 pm on  Wednesdays (episodes 1–4), Mondays (episodes 5–6), Tuesday (episode 7), Wednesday (episode 8) and Mondays (episodes 9–12)

Series 7 (2005) 

Series seven was broadcast at 9.00 pm on Tuesdays (episodes 1–12) and Monday (episode 13)

Series 8 (2006) 

Series eight was broadcast at 9.00 pm on Thursdays (episodes 1–10) and Wednesday (episode 11)

Ratings

References

External links
 

Episodes
Bad Girls
Lists of LGBT-related television series episodes